Iñaki Arriola López is a Spanish politician affiliated with the Socialist Party of the Basque Country–Basque Country Left. , he serves in the Basque Government as Regional Minister of Territorial Planning, Housing and Transport in the Third Urkullu Government led by Iñigo Urkullu. From 28 November 2016 to 8 September 2020, he served as Regional Minister for Environment, Territorial Planning and Housing in the Second Urkullu Government. From 2009 to 2012, he served as Regional Minister of Public Works, Transport and Housing in the López Government led by Patxi López. From 1993 to 2009, he served as Mayor of Eibar.

References 

Living people
Year of birth missing (living people)
Place of birth missing (living people)
Socialist Party of the Basque Country–Basque Country Left politicians
Mayors of places in the Basque Country
Government ministers of the Basque Country (autonomous community)
People from Eibar